Glutamate receptor 1 is a protein that in humans is encoded by the GRIA1 gene.

Function 

Glutamate receptors are the predominant excitatory neurotransmitter receptors in the mammalian brain and are activated in a variety of normal neurophysiologic processes. These receptors are heteromeric protein complexes with multiple subunits, each possessing transmembrane regions, and all arranged to form a ligand-gated ion channel. The classification of glutamate receptors is based on their activation by different pharmacologic agonists. The GRIA1 belongs to a family of alpha-amino-3-hydroxy-5-methyl-4-isoxazole propionate (AMPA) receptors. Each of the members (GRIA1–4) include flip and flop isoforms generated by alternative RNA splicing. The receptor subunits encoded by each isoform vary in their signal transduction properties. The isoform presented here is the flop isoform. In situ hybridization experiments showed that human GRIA1 mRNA is present in granule and pyramidal cells in the hippocampal formation.

GRIA1 (GluR1) is centrally involved in synaptic plasticity.  Expression of the GluR1 gene is significantly reduced in the human frontal cortex with increasing age.

Interactions
GRIA1 has been shown to interact with:
 DLG1
 EPB41L2, and
 GRID2.

See also
 AMPA receptor

References

Further reading

External links
 

Ionotropic glutamate receptors